Dolichotarsina is a genus of tachinid flies in the family Tachinidae from Madagascar.

Species
D. gracilis Mesnil, 1977

References

Exoristinae
Diptera of Africa
Tachinidae genera